The Splendid Table is a weekly radio program about food hosted by Francis Lam. The program began in 1997 on Minnesota Public Radio, and was originally hosted by Lynne Rossetto Kasper until her retirement in 2017. It is produced and distributed by American Public Media and airs weekends nationwide on public radio stations.  It provides listeners with information on food preparation, appreciation, and culture.  The program features travel-related material on restaurants and cuisine from around the country and the world, and also features talk segments in which the host takes calls from listeners with food-related questions. Guests vary from week to week, but have longtime contributors such as food writers Jane and Michael Stern. The program's tagline is "the radio show for people who love to eat".  The show served as an inspiration for the popular Saturday Night Live skit "The Delicious Dish".

Awards
 Named "1998 Best National Radio Show on Food" by the James Beard Foundation
 Named "2000 Best National Syndicated Talk Show" by American Women in Radio and Television
 Named "2008 Best National Radio Show on Food" by the James Beard Foundation

See also
List of food podcasts

References

External links

Local Broadcast Information for The Splendid Table
Podcast Information for The Splendid Table

American Public Media programs
James Beard Foundation Award winners
Audio podcasts

1997 radio programme debuts